Wally Catchlove (24 February 1907 – 12 April 1997) was an Australian cricketer. He played nine first-class matches for South Australia between 1931 and 1934.

See also
 List of South Australian representative cricketers

References

External links
 

1907 births
1997 deaths
Australian cricketers
South Australia cricketers
Cricketers from Adelaide